Kodunuiyeh (also Romanized as Kodūnū’īyeh and Kedūnū’īyeh; also known as Kadnoo’iyeh, Kodnū’īyeh, Kodonūīyeh, and Kudnuyeh) is a village in Lay Siyah Rural District, in the Central District of Nain County, Isfahan Province, Iran. At the 2006 census, its population was 110, in 40 families.

References 

Populated places in Nain County